The 2019 FIBA U20 European Championship Division B was the 15th edition of the Division B of the FIBA U20 European Championship, the second-tier level of the European Under-20 basketball championship. The tournament was played in Matosinhos, Portugal, from 12 to 21 July 2019.

Participating teams

  (15th place, 2018 FIBA U20 European Championship Division A)

  (16th place, 2018 FIBA U20 European Championship Division A)

  (14th place, 2018 FIBA U20 European Championship Division A)

Group phase
In the Group phase, the 21 participating teams are divided into three groups of five and one group of six. Teams play four or five games within their group.

Group A

Group B

Group C

Group D

17th−21st place classification

Group E

Group F

Romania will play for 17th place; Ireland will play for 19th place.

19th place game

17th place game

9th−16th place playoffs

Championship playoffs

Final

Final standings

See also
2019 FIBA U20 European Championship (Division A)

References

External links
FIBA official website

FIBA U20 European Championship Division B
FIBA Europe Under-20 Championship, Div B
2019–20 in Portuguese basketball
International youth basketball competitions hosted by Portugal
Sport in Matosinhos
July 2019 sports events in Europe
July 2019 sports events in Portugal
FIBA Europe U-20 Championship Division B
FIBA U20